Janowo  is a village in the administrative district of Gmina Narew, within Hajnówka County, Podlaskie Voivodeship, in north-eastern Poland.

The village has an approximate population of 40.

References

Janowo